XHVK-FM is a radio station on 106.7 FM in Gómez Palacio, Durango. The station is owned by Radiorama and carries a romantic music format known as Pasión.

History
XHVK began as XEVK-AM 1010, with a concession awarded to Emisoras de Torreón, S.A., property of José Luis de la Rosa, on January 23, 1962. Before even going on air, XEVK went on strike, because the National Union of Radio Station Employees wanted a collective contract signed for the new station.

It migrated to FM in 2011 on 106.7 MHz.

As part of the 2017 renewal of XHVK's concession, it is slated to move to 96.7 MHz in the near future in order to clear 106-108 MHz as much as possible for community and indigenous radio stations. The Vida Romántica brand was dropped for "Pasión" in 2021, remaining in the romantic format.

References

Radio stations in Durango
Radio stations in the Comarca Lagunera